The 2013 FIFA Beach Soccer World Cup CONMEBOL qualifier, also commonly known as the 2013 South American Beach Soccer Championship, was the fifth Beach Soccer World Cup qualification championship for South America, held from February 10–17 at Parque Recreativo, in Merlo, a town in the San Luis Province of Argentina.

The qualifiers were not coordinated by CONMEBOL at the time. The event was organised by Beach Soccer Worldwide (BSWW), under the FIFA Beach Soccer World Cup Qualifier title. CONMEBOL first recognised the tournament this year, under the title South American Beach Soccer Championship, also acknowledging the 2006–11 events as historic editions of the championship. CONMEBOL eventually began organising the qualifiers in 2017, under a new title.

Participating teams
The same nine nations who played in the 2011 qualifiers have entered into the tournament:

Match officials
Here is the list of match officials for this tournament:

  Cesar Figueredo (head official)
  Mario Jose Narciso Romo y Pablo Valentin Del Puerto Gudin
  Felipe Duarte Varejao
  Patricio Alberto Blanca Fuentes
  Jose Cortez Ortiz
  Gustavo Alberto Dominguez
  Micke Palomino Huamani
  Javier Roberto Betancor Porteiro y Carlos Ismael Aguirregaray 
  Jose Miguel Misel Navarro

Group stage
The draw to divide the nine teams into two groups (one will have five teams, the other will have four) was conducted on 8 January 2013. The subsequent schedule seen here is the official schedule, which was finally released on 9 February 2013.

All match times will be correct to that of local time in Merlo, being Argentina Time, (UTC-03:00).

Group A

Group B

Playoff Stage

Seventh place playoff
Since there are nine teams in the tournament, it was decided that a group stage-like playoff to determine the bottom three placements would be held. This group would involve the 4th and 5th-place finishers in Group A and the 4th-place finisher in Group B.

Fifth place playoff

Championship playoff

Semifinals

Third place playoff

Final

Winners

Awards

Teams Qualifying

Final Placement

References

2013
Qualification Conmebol
Beach Soccer Championship
International association football competitions hosted by Argentina
2013 in beach soccer
February 2013 sports events in South America